Lake Arbor is an unincorporated area and census-designated place (CDP) in Prince George's County, Maryland, United States. The population was 14,541 at the 2020 census. It is one of the nation's most affluent African-American communities. The ZIP Codes encompassing the CDP area are 20721 and 20774.

In the 1990s, the U.S. Census Bureau defined the area now delineated as Lake Arbor CDP as being in Mitchellville CDP. The Lake Arbor CDP was delineated as of the 2000 U.S. Census.

History
Lake Arbor was originally known as Newbridge, a development of Levitt & Sons, developers of the early planned communities of Levittown in Pennsylvania and Long Island, New York, respectively.  When the project went bankrupt in the mid-1970s after selling only 41 houses, Manufacturer's Hanover Trust acquired the debt and held it as REO (real estate owned) for approximately 10 years until a limited partnership composed of David A. Gitlitz, Alvin Dworman, Phillip Abrahms, Phillip D. Winn, and Gary S. Lachman acquired it. Under the direction of Gitlitz, and with technical engineering assistance from Abrahms, Lachman changed the name of the property to Lake Arbor and developed it into the master planned community it is today.

The story of Lake Arbor is emblematic of the socio-economic and demographic evolution of Prince George's County that occurred in the mid-1980s. Against the strong resistance of many large national builders who perceived Prince George’s County as a price-sensitive retreat for urban African Americans who neither wanted nor could afford upscale amenities for their homes, Gary S. Lachman contractually required features like two-car garages, brick, and elaborate landscaping from builders who purchased lots in this community. To the pleasant surprise of the builders, buyers rushed to embrace (and pay for) these features. Firmly demonstrating both the sophisticated tastes and buying power of the predominantly African American market, as well as codifying architectural standards requested (but not mandated) by county executives such as Winnie Kelly and Governor Parris Glendening, Lake Arbor established Prince George’s County as the most desirable destination for young, affluent African American families moving from Washington, DC for a suburban lifestyle.

Geography
Lake Arbor is located at  (38.908306, −76.829525).

Demographics

2020 census

Note: the US Census treats Hispanic/Latino as an ethnic category. This table excludes Latinos from the racial categories and assigns them to a separate category. Hispanics/Latinos can be of any race.

2000 Census
As of the census of 2000, there were 8,533 people, 3,493 households, and 2,165 families residing in the CDP. The racial makeup of the CDP was 7.20% White, 88.74% African American, 0.28% Native American, 1.77% Asian, 0.02% Pacific Islander, 0.42% from other races, and 1.57% from two or more races. Hispanic or Latino of any race were 1.64% of the population.

There were 3,493 households, out of which 34.2% had children under the age of 18 living with them, 40.1% were married couples living together, 17.1% had a female householder with no husband present, and 38.0% were non-families. 32.7% of all households were made up of individuals, and 8.7% had someone living alone who was 65 years of age or older. The average household size was 2.42 and the average family size was 3.11.

In the CDP, the population was spread out, with 25.7% under the age of 18, 6.3% from 18 to 24, 36.9% from 25 to 44, 22.1% from 45 to 64, and 9.0% who were 65 years of age or older. The median age was 36 years. For every 100 females, there were 76.4 males. For every 100 females age 18 and over, there were 71.3 males.

The median income for a household in the CDP was $74,599, and the median income for a family was $89,775. Males had a median income of $52,617 versus $45,644 for females. The per capita income for the CDP was $35,700. About 0.6% of families and 1.9% of the population were below the poverty line, including 0.4% of those under age 18 and 9.2% of those age 65 or over.

Economy
When it was in operation, The Boulevard at the Capital Centre was in Lake Arbor CDP.

When it existed, Crown Books had its headquarters in what is now Lake Arbor.

Government
The U.S. Postal Service operates the Largo Post Office in Lake Arbor CDP, with a Largo postal address.

Education
Prince George's County Public Schools serves Lake Arbor.

The zoned schools are Lake Arbor Elementary School, Ernest Everett Just Middle School, and Charles Herbert Flowers High School.

Transportation
Washington Metro Largo Town Center station is in Lake Arbor CDP.

References

Census-designated places in Prince George's County, Maryland
Census-designated places in Maryland